The 5th Engineer Regiment is a military engineer regiment of the Italian Army based in Macomer in Sardinia. Today the regiment is the engineer unit of the Mechanized Brigade "Sassari".

History 
On 1 November 1895 the 5th Engineer Regiment (Miners) was formed in Rivoli with personnel from the 1st Engineer Regiment, 2nd Engineer Regiment, and 3rd Engineer Regiment. The regiment consisted of a staff, four brigades, a train company, and a depot. In 1896 the regiment moved to Turin. In 1910 the brigades were renamed battalions. During the Italo-Turkish War of 1911-12 the regiment's 7th, 8th, and 9th companies were deployed to Libya.

World War I 
During World War I battalions and companies raised by the regiment fought in all sectors of the Italian front. In total the regiment formed nine miners battalion commands and 53 miners companies. The regiment also formed autonomous cableway, motorists, and water companies and platoons, and two territorial militia companies.

On 21 November 1919 the regiment was renamed Miners Engineer Regiment and consisted of a command, five battalions, and a depot. On 1 May 1920 it moved from Turin to Verona. On 30 September 1922 the regiment was disbanded and its companies transferred to the nine army corps engineer groupings, which were formed on 1 October 1922, including the 5th Army Corps Engineer Grouping in Trieste. The grouping received the Sappers Battalion and the Telegraphers Battalion of the V Army Corps, and the 8th Miners Company from the disbanded Miners Engineer Regiment. The grouping consisted of a command, a sappers-miners battalion based in Pula, a telegraphers battalion, a photo-electricians company, four dovecotes (in Trieste, Pula, Udine, and Gorizia), and a depot. On 16 October 1926 the grouping was renamed 6th Engineer Regiment and now also included a newly formed Cableway Battalion and a dovecote in Tolmin. In February 1928 the regiment provided its cableway battalion, a sappers-miners company, a telegraphers company, and two dovecotes for the formation of the 11th Engineer Regiment.

On 7 March 1932 the regiment formed a Miners-Cableway Battalion, which was transferred on 28 October 1932 to the newly formed 2nd Miners Regiment in Verona. On the same date the regiment received the 8th Company/ IV Battalion from the disbanded 2nd Radio-Telegraphers Regiment. On 29 September 1936 the regiment expanded the radio-telegraphers company to battalion and at the end of the year consisted of a command, an engineer battalion, a telegraphers battalion, a radio-telegraphers battalion, three dovecotes, and a depot. For the Second Italo-Ethiopian War the regiment provided 9 officers and 380 enlisted to deployed units. In January 1937 the telegraphers and radio-telegraphers battalions were renamed connections battalions.

World War II 
With the outbreak of World War II the regiment's depot began to mobilize new units:

 Command of the 9th Engineer Grouping
 III Engineer Battalion
 IV Army Connections Battalion
 XXXII Sappers Battalion
 LVII Mixed Engineer Battalion (for the 4th Infantry Division "Livorno")
 and many smaller units

The 5th Engineer Regiment was disbanded by invading German forces after the announcement of the Armistice of Cassibile on 8 September 1943.

Cold War 
On 5 January 1951 the 5th Engineer Regiment was reformed Belluno. The regiment consisted of a command, a training battalion, and the V Engineer Battalion. The training battalion trained the personnel of the Engineer Battalion "Folgore", Engineer Battalion "Mantova", Engineer Company "Ariete", and Engineer Company "Julia". The same year the battalion moved from Belluno to Vicenza and was assigned to the V Army Corps.

On 1 March 1953 the regiment formed the 1st and 2nd photo-electricians companies, and the 1st and 2nd camouflage companies. On 1 April 1954 the regiment was renamed 5th Engineer Grouping and consisted of a command, the V Army Corps Engineer Battalion, two photo-electricians companies, two camouflage companies, and the I and IV miners battalions, which were both based in Udine. On 1 January 1955 the grouping moved from Vicenza to Udine. On 1 April 1955 the regiment was renamed 5th 5th Engineer Regiment and transferred the 1st Photo-Electricians Company to the 1st Engineer Regiment and the 1st Camouflage Company to the 2nd Engineer Regiment. The remaining 2nd Photo-Electricians Company and 2nd Camouflage Company were disbanded on 1 June 1974.

During the 1975 army reform the army disbanded the regimental level and newly independent battalions were granted for the first time their own flags. During the reform engineer battalions were named for a lake if they supported a corps or named for a river if they supported a division or brigade. On 1 June 1975 the IV Miners Battalion was disbanded and on 31 December 1975 the 5th Engineer Regiment was disbanded. On 1 January the V Army Corps Engineer Battalion was renamed 5th Engineer Battalion "Bolsena" and assigned the flag and traditions of the 5th Engineer Regiment. On the same date the I Miners Battalion was renamed 1st Miners Engineer Battalion "Garda" and assigned the flag and traditions of the 1st Engineer Regiment and the traditions of the 1st Miners Regiment. Both battalions were assigned to the 5th Army Corps' Engineer Command and consisted of a command, a command and park company, and three engineer respectively three mining engineer companies.

For its conduct and work after the 1976 Friuli earthquake the battalion was awarded a Bronze Medal of Army Valour, which was affixed to the battalion's flag. The battalion was once again deployed after the 1980 Irpinia earthquake and was awarded a second Bronze Medal of Army Valour. On 15 July 1987 the command and park company split into a command and services company, and a special equipment company.

On 1 May 1991 the battalion moved from Udine to Foggia in the South of Italy. On in 31 August 1995 the battalion was disbanded in Foggia and on the same day the 1st Pontieri Engineer Battalion in Legnano was renamed 5th Engineer Battalion "Bolsena". The battalion was assigned to the Northeastern Military Region.

Recent times 
On 1 December 1997 the battalion was assigned to the newly formed Engineer Grouping. On 1 December 2000 it was reorganized as 5th Paratroopers Engineer Battalion "Bolsena" and assigned to the Paratroopers Brigade "Folgore". For traditional reasons the battalion was renamed on 1 June 2001 8th Paratroopers Sappers Battalion and the flag of the 5th Engineer Regiment was transferred to the Shrine of the Flags in the Vittoriano in Rome.

On 31 December 2002 the 45th Infantry Regiment "Reggio" in Macomer in Sardinia was disbanded and the next day the 5th Engineer Regiment was reformed with the personnel and materiel of the disbanded regiment.

Current structure 

As of 2022 the 5th Engineer Regiment consists of:

  Regimental Command, in Macomer
 Command and Logistic Support Company "Sirbons"
 Sappers Battalion "Bolsena"
 1st Sappers Company
 2nd Sappers Company
 3rd Sappers Company
 Deployment Support Company

The Command and Logistic Support Company fields the following platoons: C3 Platoon, Transport and Materiel Platoon, Medical Platoon, Commissariat Platoon, and EOD Platoon. Each of the two sapper companies fields a Command Platoon, an Advanced Combat Reconnaissance Teams Platoon, and two sapper platoons. The Deployment Support Company and Mobility Support Company field the battalion's heavy military engineering vehicles: Biber bridgelayers, Dachs armored engineer vehicles, cranes, excavators, Medium Girder Bridges etc. The sapper companies and Command and Logistic Support Company are equipped with VTLM "Lince" and VTMM "Orso" vehicles.

See also 
 Mechanized Brigade "Sassari"

External links
Italian Army Website: 5° Reggimento Genio Guastatori

References

Engineer Regiments of Italy